The Bukit Panjang LRT (BPLRT) is a  automated guideway transit line in Bukit Panjang, Singapore. The BPLRT is currently the only LRT line operated by SMRT Trains. As the name suggests, it serves 13 stations in the neighbourhood of Bukit Panjang and parts of Choa Chu Kang in the north-west of the country. The line was the first LRT line constructed in Singapore, having opened in 6 November 1999 by then Deputy Prime Minister Tony Tan. 

It is a fully elevated and automated people mover system. The line currently uses the Innovia APM 100 C801 and C801A rolling stock supplied by Bombardier, running in a two-car formation. With a 20-year design lifespan, a major overhaul of the system began in 2019 that is scheduled to complete in 2024, which include a new signalling and power rails system, as well as rolling stock.

History
The idea of Bukit Panjang LRT was first pitched in 1991 before the government announced in 1994 that it would pilot the system there. Two years later, construction began for the Bukit Panjang LRT, along which a few changes were distinguished from the MRT lines:
It became the first line in Singapore with a fully automated train with no drivers (driverless trains would later become a prominent feature starting from the North East Line in 2003)
There are 13 stations, a loop will be formed between stations for Bukit Panjang
There was an integrated development at the Ten Mile Junction, comprising a station, depot and shopping centre. The station was decommissioned in 2019.

The LRT was planned to run above ground to avoid the road safety issues of trams, and to avoid obstructing the KTM railway tracks, according to Low Seow Chay. Recalling "terrible" traffic jams at the junction of Woodlands Road and Choa Chu Kang Road during the early 90s, he explained: "The Bukit Panjang residents had trouble accessing the Choa Chu Kang MRT station and bus interchange including towards the city due to the poor traffic flow." The KJE was opened in 1994, diverting most of the heavy traffic and solving the problem.

In 1994, Transport Minister Mah Bow Tan, told Parliament of the need for "efficient and affordable" public transport, and that the potential of LRT as an internal feeder service was being studied. There are other intentions of the LRT to replace all the feeder buses. Today, residents of Bukit Panjang and Choa Chu Kang have LRT and feeder bus services.

The project, which was contracted to Adtranz, Keppel Corporation and Gammon Construction, was completed on 6 November 1999.

On 5 August 1997, the Land Transport Authority awarded SMRT a license to operate the LRT due to its experience with the MRT system.

On 10 December 2010, the Ten Mile Junction LRT Station closed due to retrofitting of the station, and reopened on 30 December 2011. However, on 13 January 2019, the LRT station became the first-ever operational train station in Singapore to be permanently closed together with LRT Service C, which ran from Ten Mile Junction LRT station to loop via Senja would ceased operations due to low demand.

Reliability 
The Bukit Panjang LRT has been beset by reliability issues since its inception, which was attributed to the difficult terrain and mature state of the town, in contrast to other developing towns in Singapore. Notable incidents include a collision between two trains on 19 November 2000 which injured five passengers barely a year after its opening, constant power glitches and maintenance failures, and an incident of a train skipping stations completely. The line has also suffered fatalities when passengers accessed the tracks without authorization, as its station lacked platform screen doors. In 2010, a LRT technician died of injuries sustained after being hit by a train at Phoenix station; he had been checking the power rail between Phoenix and Bukit Panjang stations.

On the late morning of 28 July 2016, a train departed Segar on Service B, but sped past Jelapang, Senja and Bukit Panjang stations. Passengers said that the emergency stop button did not function and there was no response on the emergency phone. The train finally stopped before Phoenix station after another passenger managed to call a number displayed in the train. Subsequent investigations showed that a faulty antenna on the train had resulted in the stations not being able to detect and stop the train accordingly. The emergency stop button was also designed to only function when the train was at a station and not in travel.

On 12 September 2017, speaking at an event commemorating the completion of a power-rail upgrading project for the North South and East West MRT lines, Transport Minister Khaw Boon Wan suggested that the Bukit Panjang LRT had been built as an "afterthought" due to "political pressure". Khaw said that the trains were designed in a "masochistic" manner, forcing commuters to go up and down with the twists and turns. He also compared the ride to a roller coaster, saying that it caused him dizziness. According to one commentator, his comment implies that his predecessor Mah Bow Tan erred in approving the LRT system and trivialises the work and contribution of railway engineers. Most critically, the commentator implied that the PAP government had succumbed to pressure and spent hundreds of millions of dollars without serious consideration and robust planning.

Future plans
In 2016, SMRT and LTA announced plans to completely overhaul the line as the system approached its designated lifespan of 20 years, with the other factor being the aging CX-100 train cars which was only being used in two transit systems by then, the other being Miami MetroMover. On 8 March 2017, it was announced that the system's power supply, signalling, rolling stock, track, stations, new signalling system and upgrading would be upgraded. The authority ruled out scrapping the entire system or changing to automated guided vehicles  drawn on self-power as it would cause major traffic congestion. On 3 October 2017, a tender for the revamp was called. To improve service reliability in the interim period, SMRT begin operations at 7am, instead of 5.30am, on all Sundays from 12 November 2017 until the end of that year. In a statement on 5 November 2017, SMRT said that this allows for an additional 1.5 hours for maintenance to the existing two hours.

On 7 March 2018, the Land Transport Authority awarded the contract to Bombardier Transportation for $344 million on upgrading the system. This includes replacing the line's signalling system with the new Communications-Based Train Control system for a tighter headway between each trains and thus, reducing waiting time. 19 first-generation trains will be replaced while 13 second-generation trains will be refurbished. The upgrade is slated to be completed by 2024.

Transport Minister Khaw Boon Wan had said that the authority was considering shutting down the system for a few years to complete the overhaul. He told reporters at a press briefing: "If we want to do serious upgrading — essentially to close it down so that we can re-do the whole tracks and so on, so that we don’t have these ups and downs. And we’re evaluating that proposition". This was not done as SMRT decided to proceed with an alternative plan to reduce operating hours instead during the system renewal. Ten Mile Junction station was also closed due to low demand, with the station reused as a testing station for the new C801Bs trains.

Services
There are two services on the line: A and B , both of which terminate at Choa Chu Kang.

Stations
All stations, except Choa Chu Kang, have two facing side platforms. Choa Chu Kang has an island platform, similar to most Singapore MRT stations. All the stations on the LRT have half-height platform barriers, installed between 2016 and 2017. Choa Chu Kang station also has two additional platforms and a new set of fare gates to ease crowding during peak hours.

Legend

List

Rolling stock
The Bukit Panjang LRT operates on the Bombardier Innovia APM 100 rolling stock, similar to the ones used by the Changi Airport Skytrain until 2006. An initial 19 trainsets were delivered in 1999 under C801, which bear a turquoise livery. An additional 13 trainsets were delivered in 2014 under C801A, bearing SMRT's pixel livery and a slightly different exterior design.

These trains, also known as automated people movers, are rubber-tyred for minimised operating noise within built-up areas and guided by a central guideway which also contains a power rail. They operate in both single-car and double-car arrangements, paired with a similar model (C801 and C801A trainsets are not cross-coupled).

19 Bombardier Innovia APM 300 trains have been procured under C801B as part of the Bukit Panjang LRT Overhaul. These trains will be equipped with Communications Based Train Control (CBTC) signalling system and will replace the first generation C801 trains.

Train formation
Between 1999 - 2015, the trains are in one-car (M) formation throughout the day. Two-car formations are only operated during weekday peak hours to accommodate increased demand prior to an introduction of C801A trains in 2014. It used to operate 2-cars only on Service B during Weekday morning peak while majority on Service A during Weekday evening peak.

Between 2015 till 2019, the majority of trains are in two-car (M-M) formations. Two-car formations are no longer limited to peak hours only and are now used at all times. This is due to the increase in ridership and the large number of apartments around Bukit Panjang. The units are limited to a two-car train formation because of station length. 

Since 2019 till today, all of the trains are running in two-car (M-M) formations throughout the day.

Coupling is usually done in Ten Mile Junction Depot and the trains are coupled with the same car type: C801+C801 or C801A+C801A. Occasionally units are mixed for reasons such as rescue operations or testing.

Train control
The line is equipped with Bombardier's CITYFLO 550 fixed block signalling system for automatic train control (ATC) under automatic train operation (ATO) GoA 4 (UTO). The subsystems consist of Automatic train protection (ATP) to govern train speed, Automatic Train Supervision (ATS) to track and schedule trains, and a computer-based interlocking (CBI) system that prevents incorrect signal and track points settings.

When the Innovia APM 300R C801B enters service, the line will be upgraded to use Bombardier's CITYFLO 650 moving block communications-based train control (CBTC) signalling system.

References

External links
 Bukit Panjang LRT line

1999 establishments in Singapore
Bukit Panjang
Choa Chu Kang
Innovia people movers
Light Rail Transit (Singapore) lines
Railway lines opened in 1999
Automated guideway transit